The Redfish standard is a suite of specifications that deliver an industry standard protocol providing a RESTful interface for the management of servers, storage, networking, and converged infrastructure.

History 
The Redfish standard has been elaborated under the SPMF umbrella at the DMTF in 2014. The first specification with base models (1.0) was published in August 2015. In 2016, Models for BIOS, disk drives, memory, storage, volume, endpoint, fabric, switch, PCIe device, zone, software/firmware inventory & update, multi-function NICs), host interface (KCS replacement) and privilege mapping were added. In 2017, Models for Composability, Location and errata were added. There is work in progress for Ethernet Switching, DCIM, and OCP.

In August 2016, SNIA released a first model for network storage services (Swordfish), an extension of the Redfish specification.

Industry adoption

Redfish support on server 
 Advantech SKY Server BMC
 Dell iDRAC BMC with minimum iDRAC 7/8 FW 2.40.40.40, iDRAC9 FW 3.00.00.0
 Fujitsu iRMCS5 BMC 
 HPE iLO BMC with minimum iLO4 FW 2.30, iLO5
 HPE Moonshot BMC with minimum FW 1.41
 Lenovo XClarity Controller (XCC) BMC with minimum XCC FW 1.00
 Supermicro X10 BMC with minimum FW 3.0 and X11 with minimum FW 1.0
IBM Power Systems BMC with minimum OpenPOWER (OP) firmware level OP940
IBM Power Systems Flexible Service Processor (FSP) with minimum firmware level FW860.20
Cisco Integrated Management Controller with minimum IMC SW Version 3.0

Redfish support on BMC 
 Insyde Software Supervyse BMC
OpenBMC a Linux Foundation collaborative open-source BMC firmware stack
 American Megatrends MegaRAC Remote Management Firmware
 Vertiv Avocent Core Insight Embedded Management Systems

Software using Redfish APIs 
 OpenStack Ironic bare metal deployment project has a Redfish driver.
 Ansible has multiple Redfish modules for Remote Management including redfish_info, redfish_config, and redfish_command
 ManageIQ

Redfish libraries and tools 
 DMTF libraries and tools
 Mojo::Redfish::Client
 python-redfish
 Sushy

Redfish is used by both proprietary software (such as HPE OneView) as well as FLOSS ones (such as OpenBMC).

Benefits of Redfish 
Redfish offers several benefits for admins, such as:

 Easy integration with commonly used technology such as REST or JSON
 Better performance and security than other platform management solutions
 Possibility to manage data center components from remote

See also 
 Intelligent Platform Management Interface (IPMI)
 Create, read, update and delete (CRUD)
 JSON
 OData – Protocol for REST APIs

References

External links 
 DMTF Redfish initiative
 Redfish Developer Hub
 DELL Redfish ecosystem
 HPE Redfish ecosystem
 SuperMicro Redfish ecosystem
 Lenovo Redfish ecosystem
 DMTF Redfish scripting for Gigabyte systems

Networking standards
DMTF standards
System administration
Out-of-band management
Computer hardware standards